The Kenkokukai (建国会) (National Foundation Society) was a Japanese secret society founded in April 1926. It was formed by the Nazi sympathizer Motoyuki Takabatake (高畠素之) along with Nagoya Anarchists Shinkichi Uesugi (上杉慎吉) and Bin Akao (赤尾敏). It proclaimed its object to be "the creation of a genuine people's state based on unanimity between the people and the emperor".

Goals 
Its state socialist programme included the demand for "the state control of the life of the people in order that among Japanese people there should not be a single unfortunate nor unfully-franchised individual". The organisation embraced Pan-Asianism declaring "The Japanese people standing at the head of the coloured people, will bring the world a new civilization." It was at one time in favour of universal suffrage.

The Kenkokukai worked in close contact with the police to break the miners strike in Totsige, and other strikes in factories in Kanegafuchi, tramway workers in Tokyo and tenant farmers in Gifu Prefecture. In this period it had about 10,000 members. Wesugisoon withdrew in 1927, and Takabatake supporters left following his death in 1928. Tōyama Mitsuru (頭山満), of the Black Dragon Society (黒龍会) was appointed honorary chairperson, and Nagat, a former Police Chief, vice-chair. Others of this new influx included Ikyhara, Kida, and Sugimoto. Akao was director of the league, which organised gangs of strike breakers and in 1928 bombed the Soviet embassy. Their paper Nippon Syugi was virulently anti-communist with slogans such as "Death to Communism, to Russian Bolshevism and to the Left parties and workers' unions".

References

Anti-communist organizations in Japan
Japanese nationalism
Japanese secret societies
Pan-Asianism
Political history of Japan
Organizations established in 1926